Aeriel may refer to:
 Aeriel Stiles, guitarist and songwriter with American hard rock band Pretty Boy Floyd

See also

Aerial (disambiguation)
Ariel (disambiguation)